Alejandro Agustín Lanusse (August 28, 1918 – August 26, 1996) was the de facto president of the Argentine Republic between March 22, 1971, and May 25, 1973, during the military dictatorship of the country called the "Argentine Revolution".

On March 26, 1971, Lanusse assumed the presidency in a totally unfavorable political climate.  Guerrilla violence grew, popular discontent also, the continuity of the military government became difficult to sustain.  Lanusse evaluated that the solution to the multiple conflicts was to end the proscription of Peronism and to decree a political opening that allowed a transition towards democracy.

Early life
He was born as Alejandro Agustín Lanusse Gelly on August 28, 1918, in Buenos Aires to his parents Luis Gustavo Lanusse Justo and Albertina Gelly Cantilo.

Career 
A graduate of the Army Academy (Colegio Militar de la Nación, class of 1938), he served in different Cavalry units before becoming commander of the Regimiento de Granaderos a Caballo (Regiment of Horse Grenadiers, presidential escort unit). In 1951 he was sentenced to life imprisonment for his part in an attempted coup to overthrow Juan Perón. He was released in 1955 with the Revolución Libertadora, a military uprising which ousted General Perón and set up a military dictatorship which was in power from 1955 to 1958. In 1956 he was designated Ambassador to the Holy See. In 1960 he became assistant director of the Superior Military School and later Commander of the First Armored Cavalry Division. In 1962 he took part in the overthrowing of president Arturo Frondizi, and in 1966 supported General Juan Carlos Onganía in the ousting of president Arturo Illia. In 1968 Lanusse became Commander-in-Chief of the Argentine Army.

Presidency

Lanusse became president of Argentina in 1971. During his administration he established diplomatic relations with China and continuously faced political unrest, with an increase in guerrilla activity. Many political opponents were jailed, and Lanusse decided to negotiate with the Montoneros (a Peronist guerrilla movement)  for the return of the corpse of Evita (Eva Duarte de Perón), Juan Domingo Perón's second wife whose body had been hidden by the "Revolución Libertadora". On August 22, 1971, several imprisoned guerrillas attempted to escape from the Naval Base of Rawson in Patagonia, and were executed without trial in the Trelew massacre. In March 1973 presidential elections were held, and won by Hector Cámpora.

Later years
In 1985 Lanusse published his autobiography and criticized the human rights violations that took place during the Dirty War, including the state murder of his cousin, diplomat Elena Holmberg. He was placed under house arrest in 1994 for criticizing president Carlos Menem in a magazine interview.

References

1918 births
1996 deaths
People from Buenos Aires
Argentine generals
Presidents of Argentina
Argentine people of French descent
Ambassadors of Argentina to the Holy See